Gymnophryxe inconspicua is a Palaearctic species of tachinid flies in the genus Gymnophryxe of the family Tachinidae.

Distribution
Palaearctic: China, Western & Southern Europe (Greece, Italy, Spain, Turkey, France), Iran, Mongolia, Western Siberia.

References

Diptera of Asia
Diptera of Europe
Exoristinae
Insects described in 1924
Taxa named by Joseph Villeneuve de Janti